Limonium  humile is a species of sea lavender known by the common name lax-flowered sea-lavender.

References

humile
Taxa named by Philip Miller